Xiaojing may refer to:

Classic of Filial Piety, or Xiaojing,  Confucian classic treatise giving advice on filial piety
Xiao'erjing, or Xiaojing, practice of writing Sinitic languages or the Dungan language in the Arabic script
Emperor Xiaojing of Eastern Wei (524–552),  emperor of the Chinese/Xianbei dynasty Eastern Wei 
Empress Dowager Xiaojing, consort of the Ming dynasty's Wanli Emperor